Cigu may refer to:

Sagittaria sagittifolia, known as Cigu in China, flowering plant in the family Alismataceae
Cigu, Tainan, township in Tainan, Taiwan